Southport–Nerang Road (state route 20) is a major arterial road on the Gold Coast, Queensland that connects the outlying suburb of Nerang with Southport, the Gold Coast's Central Business District.

It is a state-controlled road (number 106) of which part is in the regional network and part in the district network. It is rated as a local road of regional significance (LRRS).

Route description
Southport–Nerang Road commences in Nerang, after the intersection with Beaudesert - Nerang Road (state route 90) and continue easterly for 9.2 kilometers before terminating at the Gold Coast Highway (state route 2) in Southport.

The road includes several former suburban roads before the route was designated state route 20 and re-named Southport – Nerang Road and is still known at parts under its former names. For 1.7 kilometers between the Intersection of Wardoo Street and Queen Street the route is known as Nerang Street and 1.5 kilometers the route is known as Queen Street before briefly being called Ada Bell Way before finally terminating at the Gold Coast Highway.

Major Intersections 
The road is in the Gold Coast local government area.

See also
 List of road routes in Queensland
 List of numbered roads in Queensland

References 

Roads on the Gold Coast, Queensland
Transport on the Gold Coast, Queensland
Southport, Queensland